A by-election was held for the Australian House of Representatives seat of Grayndler on 23 June 1979. It was triggered by the death of Labor Party MP Frank Stewart.

The by-election was won by Labor candidate Leo McLeay, the Assistant General Secretary of the state's Labor branch.

Results

Frank Stewart died.

References

1979 elections in Australia
New South Wales federal by-elections
June 1979 events in Australia